Patrik Niklas-Salminen (born 5 March 1997) is a Finnish tennis player.

Niklas-Salminen has a career high ATP singles ranking of No. 418 achieved on 3 March 2020. He also has a career high ATP doubles ranking of No. 147 achieved on 21 November 2022.

On the junior tour, Niklas-Salminen had a career high ITF junior ranking of No. 20 achieved in September 2015. Niklas-Salminen reached the semifinals of the 2015 Wimbledon boys' singles event, losing to Mikael Ymer in the semifinal.

Niklas-Salminen won one singles title and ten doubles titles on the ITF Men's Circuit.

Niklas-Salminen has represented Finland in Davis Cup, where he has a win–loss record of 2–3.

External links

1997 births
Living people
Finnish male tennis players
Sportspeople from Tampere
20th-century Finnish people
21st-century Finnish people